WVXS is a Classic Rock formatted broadcast radio station licensed to Romney, West Virginia, United States, serving Hampshire and Mineral counties in West Virginia. WVXS is owned and operated by South Branch Career and Technical Center.

Change in ownership
George Park, Jr., the "longtime engineer and teacher" of the West Virginia Schools for the Deaf and Blind's broadcasting education class filed for retirement after 47 years with the school. The school donated the station to the South Branch Career and Technical Center, located in nearby Petersburg, West Virginia. The school and Park cited "declining student interest and increasing standards" as other reasons for the station's donation.  The station rebranded as "104.1 The Maverick" and later "Maverick Country 104". South Branch Career and Technical Center changed the station's callsign on October 19, 2018, to WVXS from its previous WVSB, which had stood for "West Virginia School for the Deaf and Blind".

References

External links
 Maverick Rock 104 Online
 

1973 establishments in West Virginia
Classic rock radio stations in the United States
Radio stations established in 1973
Mass media in Romney, West Virginia